August Capital, legally August Capital Master Management Company, LLC, is a venture capital firm founded by David Marquardt and John Johnston in 1995. It is focused on information technology and is based in Menlo Park, California.

Company 
August Capital specialized in growth capital and startup investments. The firm has invested in all stages with a focus on early and late stage, management buyouts, and private investments in public equity. The firm has invested in the information technology spectrum including IT infrastructure, data center technologies, systems management, security, storage, and cloud computing systems and software.

Partner David Hornik was on the Midas List in 2012.

Reference 

Venture capital firms of the United States
Companies based in Menlo Park, California
Financial services companies established in 1995
1995 establishments in California
Financial services companies based in California